Pleasure Cove is a 1979 television film directed by Bruce Bilson and starring singer Tom Jones in his acting debut alongside Constance Forslund, Melody Anderson, Jerry Lacy, David Hasselhoff and Tanya Roberts. The film was intended to be a pilot for a potential television series to cash in on the popularity of series like Fantasy Island and Love Boat but was not picked up. It aired on NBC on January 3, 1979.

Plot
The movie follows the lives of staff and guests in a holiday island resort named Pleasure Cove. Raymond Gordon is the leading protagonist (Tom Jones) playing a suave conman hiding in disguise at the resort run by manager Kim Parker (Constance Forslund) with whom he falls in love.

Cast
Tom Jones as Raymond Gordon
Constance Forslund as Kim Parker
Melody Anderson as Julie
Jerry Lacy as Chip Garvery
Joan Hackett as Martha Harrison
Harry Guardino as Bert Harrison
Shelly Fabares as Helen
David Hasselhoff as Scott
Tanya Roberts as Sally
Barbara Luna as Gail Tyler
Ron Masak as Joe

References

External links
Pleasure Cove at The Internet Movie Database

American television films
1979 television films
1979 films
Films scored by Perry Botkin Jr.